Carmenta albociliata is a moth of the family Sesiidae. It was described by Engelhardt in 1925. It is known from North America, including Texas and Arizona.

References

External links
mothphotographersgroup

Sesiidae
Moths described in 1925